Kandiaro is a town in the Naushahro Feroze District of Sindh province of Pakistan and the headquarters of Kandiaro Taluka. It is famous for Dargah Allahabad Jalsa. The city population is approximately 200,000.

The town is situated on the earthen heap or Darro, to safeguard the town from the waters of Indus (Mehran River passing north-west) and Nasrat Wah (Sada Wah, the then inundation canal, now Bhaddo).

External links
 Unions and Tehsils
 Weather of Kandiaro
Kandiaro Taluka
Naushahro Feroze District
Populated places in Sindh